IBM is a globally integrated enterprise operating in 170 countries. IBM's R&D history in Israel began in 1972 when Professor Josef Raviv established the IBM Israel Scientific Center in the Technion's Computer Science Building in Haifa. Today, over 1000 individuals work at IBM R&D locations across Israel, including Haifa, Tel Aviv, Herzliya, Rehovot, and the Jerusalem Technology Park. IBM research and development activities in Israel include a number of labs.

Haifa Research Lab 

IBM Haifa Research Laboratory (HRL) is located in Haifa, Israel. It is an IBM R&D Lab in Israel. It handles projects in the spheres of cloud computing, healthcare and life sciences, verification technologies, multimedia, event processing, information retrieval, programming environments, business transformation, and optimization technologies. HRL is the biggest IBM research center outside the US.

Established back in 1972 as the IBM Israel Scientific Center, the IBM Haifa Research Lab has grown from three researchers to over five hundred employees, including regular staff members and many students. The IBM Haifa Research Lab is located in a custom-built complex adjacent to the Haifa University campus, with branches in Haifa and Tel Aviv. Current projects include healthcare, cloud computing, formal and simulation-based verification technologies, programming environments, chip design, storage systems, information retrieval, collaboration, and much more.

At the IBM Haifa Research Lab, twenty-five percent of the technical staff have doctoral degrees in computer science, electrical engineering, mathematics, or related fields. Employees are actively involved in teaching at Israeli higher education institutions such as the Technion (Israel Institute of Technology) and supervising post-graduate theses. Many employees have received IBM awards for achievements and excellence.

Systems and Technology Group Lab 
STG incorporates the former Haifa Development Lab and develops advanced technologies for IBM's Systems and Technology Group. The STG Lab in Israel is involved in three major activities: storage technology, de-duplication software, and chip design. 
Working closely with the Israeli hi-tech community and recent IBM acquisitions in Israel, the STG Lab serves as a focal point for building a storage ecosystem in Israel. The lab also works closely with the XIV team in IBM. Its three main departments are Hardware Development, Storage Systems Development, and Diligent Technologies.

Israel Software Lab 

ILSL develops software for real-time collaboration , content discovery  and text analytics, metadata management , application security , and SOA . The teams work closely with the Lotus, Information Management, Rational, and WebSphere brands in IBM's Software Group.

List of Israeli companies acquired by IBM

In recent years IBM acquired over a dozen Israeli technology companies, which have been subsequently incorporate  into IBM R&D Labs in Israel, they include:

See also 
History of IBM research in Israel
List of multinational companies with research and development centres in Israel

References

External links
IBM Israel

1972 establishments in Israel
Technology companies established in 1972
IBM facilities
Information technology companies of Israel
Laboratories in Israel
International organizations based in Israel
Research and development in Israel